Mpangazitha born Hlubi prince, later grew to first being the commander in Chief of AmaHlubi military then later *Regent king of AmaHlubi nation* upon the death of his brother King Mthimkhulu II) in 1819 and He reigned from than utill his death in 1826. He rose to power when his father merged his house into two house's making King Bhungane II's (((Right Hand House))) with that of his brother King Mthimkhulu II's house King King Bhungane II's (((Great House))) with the intentions to unite and strengthen the Hlubi Kingdom during the times of wars. He primarily was opposed to King Matiwane of the AmaNgwane Clan.

He got the name *Pakalitha* as a Sotho version of Mpangazitha when he exiled in Basotholand (Lesotho) for 2 years. He later led his people back to their ancestral land in what is now modern-day KwaZulu-Natal, of which he encountered King Matiwane's army and died in that battle. He had begot sons which were vital to the Clan's survival, Inkosi Sidinane (((Great House))) and Inkosi Mehlomakhulu (((Right Hand House))) which established AmaHlubi communities in unoccupied land at the north and east of now modern called Eastern Cape province.

References

1825 deaths
Hlubi kings
19th-century South African people